Pecoraite is a nickel silicate mineral and a member of the serpentine group. It was named after geologist William Thomas Pecora. It is associated with the weathering-and-or oxidation of meteorites or nickel sulfide minerals such as millerite. It is also found in altered ultramafic rocks. Pecoriate is typically a green, lime green, or bluegreen mineral with a waxy, or earthy luster and a mohs hardness of 2.5. Common textural habits associated with pecoraite are curved plates, spirals and tubes. It can also be granular and massive.

See also

References 

Nickel minerals
Monoclinic minerals
Serpentine group